The Miss Missouri competition is the pageant that selects the representative for the U.S. state of Missouri in the Miss America pageant.

Clare Marie Kuebler of Wildwood was crowned Miss Missouri 2022 on June 18, 2022 at Missouri Military Academy in Mexico. She competed for the title of Miss America 2023 at the Mohegan Sun in Uncasville, Connecticut in December 2022.

History
From 1935 to 1970, the Miss Missouri pageant was held in a number of locations, including St. Louis, Kansas City, and Springfield. In 1970, the pageant was held for the first time in Mexico, which would become the pageant's home. The pageant has been held in Mexico in all following years.

Missouri has produced one Miss America: Debbye Turner (Miss America 1990). Three Miss Missouri pageant winners have won the Miss Missouri USA crown and competed in the annual Miss USA pageant, most notably Miss Missouri 2002, Shandi Finnessey, who won the Miss USA 2004 title and placed 1st runner-up at Miss Universe. Sarah French, Miss Missouri 2006, is the only titleholder who has also competed at Miss Teen USA, representing Arkansas.

Gallery of past titleholders

Results summary 
The following is a visual summary of the past results of Miss Missouri titleholders at the national Miss America pageants/competitions. The year in parentheses indicates the year of the national competition during which a placement and/or award was garnered, not the year attached to the contestant's state title.

Placements 
 Miss Americas: Debbye Turner (1990)
 1st runners-up: Edna Smith (1935), Jennifer Davis (2018)
 2nd runners-up: Soncee Brown (1992), Simone Esters (2020)
 3rd runners-up: Charlotte Nash (1923), Susan Wilson (1980), Deborah McDonald (1999)
 4th runners-up: Tamara Tungate (1987), Kimberly Massaro (1997)
 Top 10: Sara Cooper (1958), Barbara Webster (1984), Robin Riley (1988), Stephanie Patterson (1993)
 Top 12: Shelby Ringdahl (2014)
 Top 15: Corinne Groves (1926), Marguerite Jordan (1926), Virginia Morrison (1940), Amber Etheridge (2004)
 Top 16: Wauneta Bates (1937)
 Top 18: Marie Marks (1933)
 Top 20: Jennifer Hover (2002)

Awards

Preliminary awards
 Preliminary Evening Gown: Shandi Finnessey (2003)
 Preliminary Lifestyle and Fitness: Tamara Tungate (1987), Debbye Turner (1990)
 Preliminary Talent: Sara Cooper (1958), Barbara Webster (1984)

Non-finalist awards
 Non-finalist Talent: Sharon Knickmeyer (1956), Frances Biesemeyer (1970), Heather Smith (1989), Whitney Weeks (2005)

Other awards
 Dr. David B. Allman Medical Scholarship: Ann Marie Sun (1995)
 Beacom College STEM Scholarship: Simone Esters (2020)
 Quality of Life Award Finalists: Tara Osseck (2010)
 Roller Chair Parade Grand Prize: Charlotte Nash (1923)

Winners

References

External links
 Official website

Missouri
Missouri culture
Women in Missouri
Recurring events established in 1922
1922 establishments in Missouri